Shmuel Moreh (December 22, 1932 – September 22, 2017) was a professor of Arabic Language and Literature at the Hebrew University of Jerusalem and a recipient of the Israel Prize in Middle Eastern studies in 1999. In addition to having written many books and articles dealing with Arabic literature in general and Iraqi Jewish Arabic literature in particular, he has been a major contributor to Elaph, the first online daily independent journal in the Arabic language.  Professor Moreh wrote in Arabic, Hebrew, and English.

Publications in English (partial list)
 Nazik al-mala'ika and al-shi'r al-hurr in modern Arabic literature.  Jerusalem: Israel Oriental Society.  1968
 Arabic works by Jewish writers, 1863-1973.  Jerusalem: Ben Zvi Institute, 1973
 Bibliography of Arabic books and periodicals published in Israel 1948-1972.  Jerusalem : Mount Scopus Center, 1974
 Jewish poets and writers of modern Iraq.  Jerusalem: University of Jerusalem, 1974
 Modern Arabic poetry 1800-1970 : the development of its forms and themes under the influence of Western literature. Leiden : Brill, 1976
 Studies in modern Arabic prose and poetry. Leiden ; New York : E.J. Brill, 1988
 Live theatre and dramatic literature in the medieval Arab world.  New York : New York University Press, 1992
 Jewish contributions to nineteenth century Arabic theatre : plays from Algeria and Syria : a study and texts.  	Oxford : Oxford University Press, 1996
 Al Farhud : the 1941 pogrom in Iraq.  Jerusalem: Magnes Press.  2010
 Marvelous Chronicles: Biographies and Events (ʿAjāʾib al-Āthār fī ʼl-Tarājim wa-ʼl-Akhbār). 5 volumes. Jerusalem: The Max Schloessinger Memorial Foundation, The Hebrew University of Jerusalem, 2014.

Publications in Arabic (partial list)
  المطبوعات العربية التي ألفها أو نشرها الأدباء والعلماء اليهود  1863ـ1973  . القدس : معهد بن تسيفي لدراسة الجاليات اليهودية في الشرق . 1973
  فهرس المطبوعات العربية في إسرائيل 1948ـ1972 . القدس : مركز جبل سكوبس . 1974
  القصة القصيرة عند يهود العراق، ١٩٢٤-١٩٧٨. دار النشر ي.ل. ماغنس، ١٩٨١.
 مختارات من أشعار يهود العراق الحديث . القدس : معهد الدراسات الآسيوية والإفريقية . 1981
 بغداد حبيبتي: يهود العراق، ذكريات وشجون . حايفا: مكتبة كل شيء . 2012
 . عجائب الآثار في التراجم والأخبار. القدس. 2014

Publications in Hebrew (partial list)
  עולמו המיוחד של יצחק בר-משה، 1959.
  לקט מתוך דרמות ערביות، 1961.
  סכסוך ערב-ישראל בראי הספרות הערבית، 1975 (بالاشتراك مع יהושפט הרכבי, יהושע פורת)
 חקרים בתולדות יהודי עיראק ובתרבותם، 1981.
 יצירתם הספרותית והמחקרית של יוצאי עראק בעראק ובישראל בדורנו، 1982 (بالاشتراك مع לב חקק)
 שנאת יהודים ופרעות בעיראק : קובץ מחקרים ותעודות، 1992.
 מילון אימרות ומשלים של להג יהודי בבל، 1995.
  האילן והענף : הספרות הערבית החדשה ויצירתם הספרותית הערבית של יוצאי עיראק، 1997.

References

1932 births
2017 deaths
Iraqi emigrants to Israel
Iraqi Jews
Israeli Jews
Israeli orientalists
Israeli people of Iraqi-Jewish descent
Israeli writers
Academic staff of the Hebrew University of Jerusalem
Israel Prize in Middle Eastern studies recipients
Arabic–English translators